Sătmărel is a residential district of Satu Mare in Romania. Legally a village administered by the city, it was a separate commune until the 1980s. It has a population of 1,403 Inhabits

References

Districts of Satu Mare